Collected is the second compilation album by American rap rock band Limp Bizkit. Released in 2008, it a retrospective compilation album from the band's albums Three Dollar Bill, Yall$, Significant Other, Chocolate Starfish and the Hot Dog Flavored Water, Results May Vary and The Unquestionable Truth (Part 1).

Content 

Collected contains material from the band's albums Three Dollar Bill, Yall$, Significant Other, Chocolate Starfish and the Hot Dog Flavored Water, Results May Vary and The Unquestionable Truth (Part 1). The compilation was released in Europe by Spectrum Music, a subsidiary of Universal Music Group.

Music and lyrics 

The music of Collected has predominantly been described as nu metal and is noted for "kinetic, frenzied energy". On this compilation, DJ Lethal functions as a sound designer for the band, shaping their sound. According to Lethal, "I try and bring new sounds, not just the regular chirping scratching sounds. [...] It's all different stuff that you haven't heard before. I'm trying to be like another guitar player." Though the band is generally opposed to the use of solos, they allowed drummer John Otto to perform an extended solo in the middle of the song "Nobody Like You".

Wes Borland's guitar playing on this compilation is experimental and nontraditional, and is noted for creative use of six and seven-string guitars. The songs from Three Dollar Bill, Yall$ feature him playing without a guitar pick, performing with two hands, one playing melodic notes, and the other playing chord progressions. His guitar playing on this album also makes use of octave shapes, and choppy, eighth-note rhythms, sometimes accompanied by muting his strings with his left hand, creating a percussive sound. Borland's guitar playing also has unevenly accented syncopated sixteenth notes to create a disorienting effect, and hypnotic, droning licks. The song "Stuck" uses a sustain pedal in the first bar, and muted riffs in the second bar.

Durst's lyrics are often profane, scatological or angry. Much of Durst's lyrical inspiration came from growing up and his personal life. His breakup with her inspired the Significant Other songs "Nookie" and "Re-Arranged".

Critical reception 

Collected did not chart. Allmusic's James Christopher Monger gave the album 2.5 out of 5, writing "Fans of the raucous rap/nu/alternative metal outfit would be better off with 2005's Greatest Hitz compilation".

Track listing

Personnel 

 Fred Durst - vocals
 Wes Borland - guitars
 Mike Smith - guitar on track 3
 Randy Pereira - guitar on track 8
 Sam Rivers - bass
 John Otto - drums, percussion
 DJ Lethal - turntables, samples, keyboards, programming, sound development

References 

2008 greatest hits albums
Limp Bizkit compilation albums
Albums produced by Rick Rubin